Cape Howard is a high, flat-topped, snow-covered cape at the extremity of the peninsula separating Lamplugh Inlet and Odom Inlet, on the east coast of Palmer Land, Antarctica. It was discovered by members of the United States Antarctic Service who explored along this coast by land and from the air in 1940, and was named by the Advisory Committee on Antarctic Names for August Howard, founder of the American Polar Society and editor of The Polar Times.

References

Headlands of Palmer Land